Sahebganj  is a village in the Dinhata II CD block in the Dinhata subdivision of the Cooch Behar district in the state of West Bengal, India.

Geography

Location

Area overview
The map alongside shows the eastern part of the district. In Tufanganj subdivision 6.97% of the population lives in the urban areas and 93.02% lives in the rural areas. In Dinhata subdivision 5.98% of the population lives in the urban areas and 94.02% lives in the urban areas. The entire district forms the flat alluvial flood plains of mighty rivers.

Note: The map alongside presents some of the notable locations in the subdivisions. All places marked in the map are linked in the larger full screen map.

Civic administration

Police station
There is a police station at Sahebganj.

CD block HQ
The headquarters of the Dinhata II CD block are located at Sahebganj.

Demographics
As per the 2011 Census of India, Sahebganj had a total population of 6,304.  There were 3,279 (52%) males and 3,025 (48%) females. There were 698 persons in the age range of 0 to 6 years. The total number of literate people in Sahebganj was 4,338 (77.38% of the population over 6 years).

References

Villages in Cooch Behar district